Middlegate, Middle Gate, or MiddleGate may refer to:

Buildings
 Middle Gate School, an elementary school in Newton, Connecticut, United States
 Middlegate, a house located in Ellanor C. Lawrence Park in Chantilly, Virginia, United States

Cities and towns
 Middlegate, Nevada, United States
 Middlegate, Norfolk Island, Australia
 Middlegate Village, a master-planned community in Copperfield, Texas, United States

Other
 Middle Gate (Piraeus), one of the city gates in the wall of Piraeus, Athens, Greece
 MiddleGate Books, a series of children's fantasy books by Rae Bridgman
 Middlegate Formation, a geologic formation in Nevada, United States
 Middlegate Japanese Gardens, a Japanese garden in Pass Christian, Mississippi, United States